Charles White Whittlesey (January 20, 1884 – November 26, 1921) was a United States Army Medal of Honor recipient who led the Lost Battalion in the Meuse–Argonne offensive during World War I. He committed suicide by drowning when he jumped from a ship en route to Havana on November 26, 1921, at age 37.

Early life  

Charles White Whittlesey was born in Florence, Wisconsin, where his father worked as a logger, and he attended school in Green Bay, Wisconsin. He moved with his family in 1894 to Pittsfield, Massachusetts, where he graduated from Pittsfield High School in the class of 1901. He enrolled at Williams College, where he was a member of St. Anthony Hall, graduating in 1905. He was voted the "third-brightest man" in his class, and because of his aristocratic manner was nicknamed "Count." He earned a law degree from Harvard Law School in 1908. Soon after graduating, he formed a law partnership with his Williams classmate J. Bayard Pruyn in New York City. Influenced by his friend and roommate at Williams, Max Eastman, Whittlesey spent several years as a member of the American Socialist Party before resigning his membership in disgust over what he viewed as the movement's increasing extremism.

World War I  
In May 1917, a month after the American entry into World War I, Whittlesey took a leave from his partnership and joined the United States Army. He shipped for the Western Front as a captain in the 308th Infantry, 77th Division. The 77th Division was known as the "Metropolitan Division," because it was made up largely of New York City men, principally from the polyglot Lower East side. Its members spoke 42 different languages or dialects.

By September 1917 Whittlesey was promoted to major and placed in command of a battalion. On the morning of October 2, 1918, the 77th Division was ordered to move forward against a heavily fortified German line as part of a massive American attack in the Meuse-Argonne region. Whittlesey commanded a mixed battalion of 554 soldiers, who advanced forward through a ravine. The following days were perilous for Whittlesey and his men, as they were without food or water. Some of the men had never thrown a live grenade, but for four days, they resisted snipers and attacks by waves of German troops armed with hand grenades, and in one incident, flame throwers. During this period war correspondents seized on the incident and dubbed the unit the "Lost Battalion".

On October 7, the Germans sent forward a blindfolded American POW carrying a white flag, with a message in English:

Whittlesey's alleged reply was "You go to hell!", although he later denied saying it, stating a response was unnecessary. He ordered white sheets that had been placed as signals for Allied aircraft to drop supplies to be pulled in so they would not be mistaken for surrender signals. That night, a relief force arrived and the Germans retreated. Of the original 554 troops involved in the advance, 107 had been killed, 63 were missing and 190 were wounded. Only 194 were able to walk out of the ravine.

Awards and decorations  
Whittlesey's awards and decorations included the following:

Medal of Honor citation  

For conspicuous gallantry and intrepidity at the risk of his life above and beyond the call of duty:
Although cut off for five days from the remainder of his division, Major Whittlesey maintained his position, which he had reached under orders received for an advance, and held his command, consisting originally of 46 officers and men of the 308th Infantry and of Company K of the 307th Infantry, together in the face of superior numbers of the enemy during the five days. Major Whittlesey and his command were thus cut off, and no rations or other supplies reached him, in spite of determined efforts which were made by his division. On the 4th day Major Whittlesey received from the enemy a written proposition to surrender, which he treated with contempt, although he was at the time out of rations and had suffered a loss of about 50 percent in killed and wounded of his command and was surrounded by the enemy.

Later life 
Whittlesey received a battlefield promotion to lieutenant colonel and returned to the United States as a war hero, receiving on December 6, 1918, one of the first three Medals of Honor awarded for valor in the war. (One of the other two went to his second-in-command, George G. McMurtry.) The story of the Lost Battalion was one of the most talked about events of World War I. In 1919, the events were made into a film in which Whittlesey was featured. He tried to return to his career, working as a lawyer at the Wall Street firm of White & Case, but found himself in constant demand for speeches, parades, and honorary degrees. The pressure wore on him; he said to a friend: "Not a day goes by but I hear from some of my old outfit, usually about some sorrow or misfortune. I cannot bear it much more."

Whittlesey never married or had children.

Death 
In November 1921, Whittlesey acted as a pallbearer at the burial of the Unknown Soldier at Arlington National Cemetery, along with fellow Medal of Honor recipients Samuel Woodfill and Alvin York. On November 26, 1921, his first night out of New York, he dined with the captain and left the smoking room at 11:15 p.m. stating he was retiring for the evening, and it was noted by the captain that he was in good spirits. Whittlesey was never seen again and committed suicide by jumping overboard; his body was never recovered. Before leaving New York, he prepared a will leaving his property to his mother. He also left a series of letters in his cabin addressed to relatives and friends. The letters were addressed to his parents, his brothers Elisha and Melzar, his uncle Granville Whittlesey, and to his friends George McMurtry, J. Bayard Pruyn, Robert Forsyth Little and Herman Livingston, Jr. Also in his cabin was found a note to the captain of the Toloa leaving instructions for the disposition of the baggage left in his stateroom. In a one-page will found at his law office, Whittlesey left McMurtry the German letter demanding the surrender of the Lost Battalion. Whittlesey's suicide was front-page news, although those close to him were not surprised. In his eulogy at Whittlesey's funeral, Colonel Averill, the 308th's commander, said Whittlesey's death "was in reality a battle casualty and that he met his end as much in the line of duty as if he had fallen by a German bullet."

Monuments and memorials 
Whittlesey's cenotaph is in a cemetery in Pittsfield, Massachusetts. It notes that his body was never recovered. In 1948, the Charles White Whittlesey Room was dedicated at New York City's Williams Club.

In popular culture 
In 2001, U.S. television channel A&E made a television movie called The Lost Battalion based on accounts of the battle. In that portrayal Whittlesey was played by Rick Schroder.

In 2016, a Swedish heavy metal band Sabaton honor his heroics with the "Lost Battalion" title track in their eighth album, The Last Stand.

In 2020, the novel Cher Ami and Major Whittlesey by Kathleen Rooney was released.

See also  
 List of Medal of Honor recipients for World War I
 List of members of the American Legion
 List of people from Wisconsin
 List of suicides
 List of drowning victims

References

Citations

Bibliography

Further reading

External links 

 
 
 
 
 Charles W. Whittlesey in the Vanity Fair Hall of Fame (1918)
 Charles W. Whittlesey collection at Williams College Special Collections.

 
1884 births
1921 suicides
United States Army Infantry Branch personnel
1920s missing person cases
20th-century American lawyers
United States Army personnel of World War I
American military personnel who committed suicide
Harvard Law School alumni
New York (state) lawyers
Officiers of the Légion d'honneur
Organization founders
People declared dead in absentia
People from Florence, Wisconsin
People lost at sea
Suicides by drowning
United States Army Medal of Honor recipients
United States Army officers
Williams College alumni
World War I recipients of the Medal of Honor
Military personnel from Wisconsin